Faramarz Aslani (born July 13, 1954) is an Iranian singer, guitarist, composer, songwriter, and music producer.

Biography
Faramarz Aslani was born in Tehran, Iran. He is a graduate of London University's College of Journalism and has written for several Persian and English publications since his graduation in the early seventies. Upon returning to his native country, he worked for one of two English dailies, Tehran Journal until he was spotted by the President of CBS, in Tehran. His first album, Occupation of The Heart, recorded for CBS in 1977, has remained on the best-sellers chart since its debut. He also recorded a second album, Hafez, a Memorandum, for the same company. In this album, he wrote music to eight poems of Hafez, Iran's, most famous poet and mystic.
After the 1979 revolution in Iran, he took his family back to England, where he worked both as a journalist and a musician. Faramarz has two daughters, Phaedra and Roxana, who are both successful artists, from his previous marriage. Their latest album has been a hit in the United Kingdom. His first tour of the United States began in 1992 when he opened at the Shrine Auditorium and was received by an eager and excited audience. About his latest album, he says: "these songs are the addition of all the sweet and bitter memories of my life." In 2010, Faramarz released his first album since 1999 titled The Third Line (Khatte Sevvom), in his first collaboration with independent record label Bamahang Productions. He currently lives in the United States.

Music career
In his second album, Hafez, A Memorandum, he wrote music based on eight poems of Hafez, Iran's most famous classical poet. In the most recent years, he has released two albums, Rouza ye Taraneh o Andouh (Days of Song and Sorrow) and Khatt-e Sevvom (The Third Line).

He has also collaborated with several other Iranian artists, on various albums. Rumi, The Beloved Is Here, was a collaboration with Dariush Eghbali and Ramesh. That album is an ode to the great poet and mystic, Rumi. Aslani also featured on Shahrzad Sepanlou's album, Yealbum he (One Day) on the song "Maa" (Us). In 2011, Dariushthe  Eghbali and Faramarz Aslani came together again to sing a duet, "Divar" (Wall), as they began their year and a half duet world tour, called The Legends Concert; which took them to 28 cities, from the Far East to the Middle East, to Europe and North America. He is a judge on Persian Talent Show.

Discography

Studio albums

 Ageh Ye Rooz (Occupation of The Heart) 1977 Columbia Records (CBS)
 Hafez, a Memorandum 1978 Columbia Records (CBS) 
 Days of Songs & Sorrow 1999 Caltex Records
 Rumi (The Beloved Is Here) 2002 DBF Records
 The Third Line 2010 Bamahang Productions.
  Nimeh Shab Ta Bamdad 2017

Singles
 "Soroude Karegar" 1979
 "Parastooha" 1998 (Ft. Faramarz Assef)
 "Ma 2010" (Ft. Shahrzad Sepandlou)
 "Age Ye Rooz 2011" (Ft. Dariush)
 "Ey Eshgh 2011" (Ft. Dariush)
 "Divar 2011" (Ft. Dariush)
 "To 2013" (Unplugged)
 "Do Dariche" 2014
 "Nakhab Koroush" 2018

References

External links
Official Website Of Faramarz Aslani

1954 births
Living people
Iranian composers
Iranian musicians
Iranian guitarists
People from Tehran
Iranian pop singers
Iranian songwriters
Iranian singer-songwriters
Singers from Tehran
Iranian male singers
Caltex Records artists
Taraneh Records artists
Iranian music arrangers
Columbia Records artists
20th-century Iranian male singers
Alumni of the University of London
Iranian emigrants to the United States
Iranian emigrants to the United Kingdom
Iranian expatriates in the United States
Iranian expatriates in the United Kingdom
Naturalised citizens of the United Kingdom
Exiles of the Iranian Revolution in the United States
Exiles of the Iranian Revolution in the United Kingdom